Elliniko (meaning "Hellenic" or "Greek") is a coastal suburb of Athens, Greece. Since the 2011 local government reform, it is part of the municipality Elliniko-Argyroupoli, of which it is a municipal unit. Elliniko is known for the Hellinikon Olympic Complex, built on the grounds of the former Ellinikon International Airport for the 2004 Summer Olympics.

Elliniko is the site of a major development for coastal Athens beginning in 2020 and due for completion in 2026 - the Hellenikon Metropolitan Park consisting of luxury homes, hotels, a casino, a marina, shops, offices and Greece's tallest buildings such as the Riviera Tower and Hard Rock Hotel & Casino.

History 
In 1922 after the Greco-Turkish War, many refuges, especially from the Sürmene town of Pontus, settled in the northernmost area of Elliniko, which was subsequently named Sourmena (Σούρμενα).

Geography

The municipality has an area of >. The former airport is in the western part of the municipal unit, near the coast. Most of the residential area is in the eastern part, east of the former airport. The northern part of the airport has been converted to a sports complex. There are plans to convert the remaining part into a park.

Elliniko is well connected to the centre of Athens through a new line of the Athens metro (Elliniko station). The Athens Tram serves the coastal part of Elliniko.

Economy
Hellenic Imperial Airways had its head office in Elliniko. The Greek Civil Aviation Authority also has its head office in Elliniko.

Climate 

Sports
Hellinikon Olympic Complex is located in Elliniko. It was built for the staging of the 2004 Summer Olympics and consists five venues. Elliniko also houses the basketball club Elliniko-Sourmena B.C. with many achievements in women's basketball.

Historical population

See also

List of municipalities of Attica

References

External links
 Official website 

Elliniko-Argyroupoli
Populated places in South Athens (regional unit)